is a district located in Yamanashi Prefecture, Japan.

As of 2006, the district has a population of 20,909 according to the 2020 Census. The total area is 9.15 km2.

The district has only one town.
Shōwa

District Timeline
On April 1, 2003 the towns of Shirane, Wakakusa, Kushigata and Kōsai, and the villages of Hatta and Ashiyasu merged to form the new city of Minami-Alps.
On September 1, 2004 the towns of Ryūō and Shikishima merged with the town of Futaba, from Kitakoma District, to form the new city of Kai.
On February 20, 2006 the towns of Tamaho and Tatomi merged with the village of Toyotomi, from Higashiyatsushiro District, to form the new city of Chūō.

Districts in Yamanashi Prefecture